Jazmyn Simon (born December 30, 1980) is an American actress known for Ballers, Raising Dion, and Locked Down. Simon is the wife of actor Dulé Hill. In 2019, the couple had their first son.

Filmography

Film

Television

References

External links
 

Living people
21st-century American actresses
American television actresses
African-American actresses
1980 births
Actresses from San Francisco
Actresses from California
21st-century African-American women
21st-century African-American people
20th-century African-American people
20th-century African-American women